Anders Friberg (born 6 August 1975) is a retired Swedish football defender.

References

1975 births
Living people
Swedish footballers
Lunds BK players
Trelleborgs FF players
Bryne FK players
Landskrona BoIS players
Ängelholms FF players
Association football defenders
Swedish expatriate footballers
Expatriate footballers in Norway
Swedish expatriate sportspeople in Norway
Allsvenskan players
Eliteserien players